"It's Not for Me to Say" is a 1957 popular song with music by Robert Allen and lyrics by Al Stillman. It was written for the 1957 movie Lizzie (starring Eleanor Parker), and was sung by Johnny Mathis in the film.

Mathis' recording of the song, arranged by Ray Conniff, was the most successful version, reaching number 5 on the Billboard Top 100 singles chart.

In Canada, the song was number two for seven weeks (June 24 - August 5), kept out of number one for six of those weeks by Elvis Presley's (Let Me Be Your) Teddy Bear.

Other film appearances
1987 Tin Men - sung by Johnny Mathis.
1988 Everybody's All-American - the Johnny Mathis version is heard.
1990 Goodfellas - performed by Johnny Mathis. (The double date; Karen is introduced, and ignored by Henry)
2007 Zodiac - sung by Johnny Mathis.
2013 A Case of You - performed by Johnny Mathis.
2014 Every Secret Thing - performed by Carolyn Leonhart

References

1957 songs
1957 singles
Columbia Records singles
Johnny Mathis songs
Jane Morgan songs
Grammy Hall of Fame Award recipients
Songs with lyrics by Al Stillman
Songs with music by Robert Allen (composer)